Cyzistra or Kyzistra was a town of ancient Cappadocia, inhabited during Roman and Byzantine times. It was mentioned by Ptolemy.

Its site is located near Zengibar Kalesi, Asiatic Turkey.

References

Populated places in ancient Cappadocia
Former populated places in Turkey
Populated places of the Byzantine Empire
Roman towns and cities in Turkey
History of Kayseri Province